GPR113 is a gene that encodes the Probable G-protein coupled receptor 113 protein.

Gene
The Homo sapiens GPR113 gene is located on chromosome 2 (2p23.3). This gene spans the length of a 38.65kb region from base 26531041 to 26569685 on the negative strand. The GPR113 gene has two neighbors on either side on the negative strand: OTOF otoferlin preceding and HADHA hydroxyacyl-CoA following. Directly opposite the GPR113 on the positive strand is the EPT1 gene.
The GPR113 gene is also known by the aliases PGR23 and HGPCR37.

Homology & Evolution
The GPR113 has 5 human paralogs GPR110, GPR115, GPR128, GPR111, and GPR116. GPR113 is well conserved in mammals from primates to semi-aquatic species, as well as some amphibians. These include the Common Chimpanzee, the African Bush Elephant, the Platypus, and the Western Clawed Frog. Homologous domains that are well conserved throughout orthologs center in the 7 transmembrane receptor (Secretin family) region highlighted in purple in the figure.

Protein

The protein product of GPR113 gene is a G-protein coupled receptor. The protein has three transcript variants in humans. Of these three, GPR113 Variant 1 has the longest amino acid sequence, and has the highest identity to orthologs. This leads to the conclusion that GPR113 Variant 1 is the homo sapiens descendant of the ancestral GPR113 gene. GPR113 Var 1 contains 1079 Amino Acids, and is integral to the plasma membrane. The 7-pass receptor contains 4 domains highlighted in the figure at right: Signal Peptide (Red), Hormone Receptor Domain (Blue), Latrophilin/CL-1-like GPS domain (Orange), and the 7-transmembrane receptor (Purple). Between the Hormone Receptor Domain and the GPS is a Domain of unknown function that is not highlighted.

Function
GPR113 is a G protein-coupled receptor that is involved in a neuropeptide signaling pathway.

Expression & Disease
GPR113 has been found to be expressed differentially under diseased conditions. Under the condition of Type 2 diabetes, the percentile rank relative to other transcripts decreases relative to normal cell function. The deletion of TP63, which mediates a wide variety of important body processes, also produces decreased GPR113 expression. In mice brains, the cerebellum and the olfactory bulb both show transcription of the GPR113 gene. Additionally, a study from the National Institute of Deafness and Other Communication Disorders has identified GPR113 expression to be highly restricted to a subset of taste receptor cells. This paper's conclusions, coupled with olfactory bulb expression levels, could provide an avenue for future research, potentially illuminating more about GPR113's function.

Interacting Proteins
GPR113 has been shown to associate with the orphan G protein-coupled receptor GPR123.

Transcription Factors

Clinical significance
The clinical significance of this protein has not been established. However, the expression profiles provide exciting directions for future research of the GPR113 gene, especially in fields studying taste and smell.

References

Further reading

G protein-coupled receptors